The Germania C.I was a two-seat general-purpose biplane built by Germania Flugzeugwerke during World War I.

Design and development
Germania Flugzeugwerke built the C.I as a biplane of wooden construction with plywood and fabric construction. A forward firing Spandau machine gun and Parabellum machine gun were mounted in the aft cockpit.

A derivative of the C.I, the C.II, of which only a prototype was built, differed from the C.I in having staggered mainplanes and a reduced gap.

Specifications

See also

References

Bibliography
 Angelucci, Enzo. The Rand McNally Encyclopedia of Military Aircraft, 1914-1980. San Diego, California:  The Military Press, 1983. .
 Cowin, H.W. German and Austrian Aviation of World War I. Oxford, UK: Osprey Publishing Ltd, 2000. .
 Gray, Peter and Owen Thetford. German aircraft of the First World War. London: Putnam, 1970, 2nd edition. .
 van Wyngarden, G. Early German Aces of World War I. Oxford, UK: Osprey Publishing Ltd, 2006. 

Biplanes
Single-engined tractor aircraft
1910s German military reconnaissance aircraft
Military aircraft of World War I
C.01
Aircraft first flown in 1917